San Francisco is an album by jazz vibraphonist Bobby Hutcherson and saxophonist Harold Land, released on the Blue Note label in May 1971. The album features a shift away from the usual hard bop-post-bop style pursued previously by Hutcherson and Land, and shifts towards jazz fusion.

Track listing 
All compositions by Bobby Hutcherson except as indicated

 "Goin' Down South" (Sample) - 7:10
 "Prints Tie" - 7:29
 "Jazz" (Sample) - 5:26
 "Ummh" - 7:49
 "Procession" - 5:46
 "A Night in Barcelona" (Land) - 7:23

Personnel 
 Bobby Hutcherson - vibraphone, marimba, percussion
 Harold Land - tenor saxophone, flute, oboe
 Joe Sample - piano, electric piano
 John Williams - bass, Fender bass
 Mickey Roker - drums

References 

1971 albums
Blue Note Records albums
Bobby Hutcherson albums
Albums produced by Duke Pearson